Simon Francis Heffernan (born ) is an Australian  male weightlifter, competing in the 94 kg category and representing Australia at international competitions. He competed at world championships, most recently at the 2003 World Weightlifting Championships.

Major results

References

1975 births
Living people
Australian male weightlifters
Place of birth missing (living people)
Weightlifters at the 2006 Commonwealth Games
Weightlifters at the 1998 Commonwealth Games
Commonwealth Games medallists in weightlifting
Commonwealth Games silver medallists for Australia
Commonwealth Games bronze medallists for Australia
20th-century Australian people
21st-century Australian people
Medallists at the 1998 Commonwealth Games
Medallists at the 2006 Commonwealth Games